Márton Báder (born September 23, 1980) is a Hungarian former professional basketball player.

After starting his career in his homeland, Báder played in several countries including Slovenia, Croatia, Spain, Greece, Ukraine and Serbia. He was also a long-time member of the Hungarian national team.

See also
 List of foreign basketball players in Serbia

External links
 Márton Báder at aba-liga.com
 Márton Báder at acb.com
 Márton Báder at euroleague.net

1980 births
Living people
ABA League players
Alba Fehérvár players
Basketball players from Budapest
Bàsquet Manresa players
BC Khimik players
Centers (basketball) 
Hungarian expatriate basketball people in Greece
Hungarian expatriate basketball people in Serbia
Hungarian expatriate basketball people in Spain
Hungarian expatriate basketball people in Croatia
Hungarian expatriate basketball people in the Czech Republic
Hungarian expatriate basketball people in Slovenia
Hungarian expatriate basketball people in Ukraine
Hungarian men's basketball players
KK Cibona players
KK Hemofarm players
KK Krka players
Liga ACB players
Panellinios B.C. players
Power forwards (basketball)
Szolnoki Olaj KK players